In May 2012, the National Assembly of Afghanistan accepted September 9 (or September 8, variable per Solar Hijri calendar) as "a new national holiday to honour national hero Ahmad Shah Massoud and those who died fighting for the country." The date is set as a Shahrivar 18.

Ahmad Shah Massoud was an Afghan military leader from Panjshir Valley. He was a leader of the resistance against the Soviet invasion and the Taliban. He was assassinated on September 9, 2001 in a suicide attack. Massoud Day is a holiday in Afghanistan that occurs each year as a commemoration of his death.

It has also been recognised officially by San Diego County, California, home to the highest concentration of Afghani immigrants and refugees.

The holiday is celebrated as Haftai Shahid, or "Martyr Week". It is also observed as Massoud Day.

References

 (Tolo TV via [[UNAMA)]
 (Xinhua)
 (China Daily)
 (Sina)

September observances
Observances honoring victims of war
Public holidays in Afghanistan
History of Afghanistan (1992–present)
Observances set by the Solar Hijri calendar